The Two Harbors Carnegie Library, located at 320 Waterfront Avenue, Two Harbors, Minnesota, United States, is a public library building built in 1909 with a $15,000 grant from Andrew Carnegie. This was one of over 3,000 libraries in 47 states funded by Carnegie. It was built in the Classical Revival style with brick and sandstone.

References

External links
 Two Harbors Public Library

Library buildings completed in 1909
Carnegie libraries in Minnesota
Education in Lake County, Minnesota
Libraries on the National Register of Historic Places in Minnesota
Public libraries in Minnesota
National Register of Historic Places in Lake County, Minnesota
1909 establishments in Minnesota